The 2023 Arizona Diamondbacks season will be the franchise's 26th season in Major League Baseball and their 26th season at Chase Field in Phoenix, Arizona as members of the National League West Division. They will be managed by Torey Lovullo in his seventh season with the franchise.

Offseason 
The Diamondbacks finished the 2022 season 74–88, an improvement on their 2021 record of 52–110. They finished 37 games out of 1st and missed the postseason for the fifth consecutive season.

Rule changes 
Pursuant to the CBA, new rule changes will be in place for the 2023 season:

 institution of a pitch clock between pitches;
 limits on pickoff attempts per plate appearance;
 limits on defensive shifts requiring two infielders to be on either side of second and be within the boundary of the infield; and
 larger bases (increased to 18-inch squares);

Regular season

Game Log

|- style="background:
| 1 || March 30 || @ Dodgers || – || || || — || Dodger Stadium || || – ||
|- style="background: 
| 2 || March 31 || @ Dodgers || – || || || — || Dodger Stadium || || – ||
|- style="background: 
| 3 || April 1 || @ Dodgers || – || || || — || Dodger Stadium || || – ||
|- style="background: 
| 4 || April 2 || @ Dodgers || – || || || — || Dodger Stadium || || – ||
|- style="background: 
| 5 || April 3 || @ Padres || – || || || — || Petco Park || || – ||
|- style="background: 
| 6 || April 4 || @ Padres || – || || || — || Petco Park || || – || 
|- style="background: 
| 7 || April 6 || Dodgers || – || || || — || Chase Field || || – ||
|- style="background: 
| 8 || April 7 || Dodgers || – || || || — || Chase Field || || – ||
|- style="background: 
| 9 || April 8 || Dodgers || – || || || — || Chase Field || || – ||
|- style="background: 
| 10 || April 9 || Dodgers || – || || || — || Chase Field || || – ||
|- style="background: 
| 11 || April 10 || Brewers || – || || || — || Chase Field || || – ||
|- style="background: 
| 12 || April 11 || Brewers || – || || || — || Chase Field || || – ||
|- style="background: 
| 13 || April 12 || Brewers || – || || || — || Chase Field || || – ||
|- style="background: 
| 14 || April 14 || @ Marlins || – || || || — || LoanDepot Park || || – ||
|- style="background: 
| 15 || April 15 || @ Marlins || – || || || — || LoanDepot Park || || – ||
|- style="background: 
| 16 || April 16 || @ Marlins || – || || || — || LoanDepot Park || || – ||
|- style="background: 
| 17 || April 17 || @ Cardinals || – || || || — || Busch Stadium || || – ||
|- style="background: 
| 18 || April 18 || @ Cardinals || – || || || — || Busch Stadium || || – ||
|- style="background: 
| 19 || April 19 || @ Cardinals || – || || || — || Busch Stadium || || – ||
|- style="background: 
| 20 || April 20 || Padres || – || || || — || Chase Field || || – ||
|- style="background: 
| 21 || April 21 || Padres || – || || || — || Chase Field || || – ||
|- style="background: 
| 22 || April 22 || Padres || – || || || — || Chase Field || || – ||
|- style="background: 
| 23 || April 23 || Padres || – || || || — || Chase Field || || – ||
|- style="background: 
| 24 || April 24 || Royals || – || || || — || Chase Field || || – ||
|- style="background: 
| 25 || April 25 || Royals || – || || || — || Chase Field || || – ||
|- style="background: 
| 26 || April 26 || Royals || – || || || — || Chase Field || || – ||
|- style="background: 
| 27 || April 28 || @ Rockies || – || || || — || Coors Field || || – ||
|- style="background: 
| 28 || April 29 || @ Rockies || – || || || — || Coors Field || || – ||
|- style="background: 
| 29 || April 30 || @ Rockies || – || || || — || Coors Field || || – ||
|-

|- style="background: 
| 30 || May 2 || @ Rangers || – || || || — || Globe Life Field || || – ||
|- style="background: 
| 31 || May 3 || @ Rangers || – || || || — || Globe Life Field || || – ||
|- style="background: 
| 32 || May 5 || Nationals || – || || || — || Chase Field || || – ||
|- style="background: 
| 33 || May 6 || Nationals || – || || || — || Chase Field || || – ||
|- style="background: 
| 34 || May 7 || Nationals || – || || || — || Chase Field || || – ||
|- style="background: 
| 35 || May 8 || Marlins || – || || || — || Chase Field || || – ||
|- style="background: 
| 36 || May 9 || Marlins || – || || || — || Chase Field || || – ||
|- style="background: 
| 37 || May 10 || Marlins || – || || || — || Chase Field || || – ||
|- style="background: 
| 38 || May 11 || Giants || – || || || — || Chase Field || || – ||
|- style="background: 
| 39 || May 12 || Giants || – || || || — || Chase Field || || – ||
|- style="background: 
| 40 || May 13 || Giants || – || || || — || Chase Field || || – ||
|- style="background: 
| 41 || May 14 || Giants || – || || || — || Chase Field || || – ||
|- style="background: 
| 42 || May 15 || @ Athletics || – || || || — || Oakland Coliseum || || – ||
|- style="background: 
| 43 || May 16 || @ Athletics || – || || || — || Oakland Coliseum || || – ||
|- style="background: 
| 44 || May 17 || @ Athletics || – || || || — || Oakland Coliseum || || – ||
|- style="background: 
| 45 || May 19 || @ Pirates || – || || || — || PNC Park || || – ||
|- style="background: 
| 46 || May 20 || @ Pirates || – || || || — || PNC Park || || – ||
|- style="background: 
| 47 || May 21 || @ Pirates || – || || || — || PNC Park || || – ||
|- style="background: 
| 48 || May 22 || @ Phillies || – || || || — || Citizens Bank Park || || – ||
|- style="background: 
| 49 || May 23 || @ Phillies || – || || || — || Citizens Bank Park || || – ||
|- style="background: 
| 50 || May 24 || @ Phillies || – || || || — || Citizens Bank Park || || – ||
|- style="background: 
| 51 || May 26 || Red Sox || – || || || — || Chase Field || || – ||
|- style="background: 
| 52 || May 27 || Red Sox || – || || || — || Chase Field || || – ||
|- style="background: 
| 53 || May 28 || Red Sox || – || || || — || Chase Field || || – ||
|- style="background: 
| 54 || May 29 || Rockies || – || || || — || Chase Field || || – ||
|- style="background: 
| 55 || May 30 || Rockies || – || || || — || Chase Field || || – ||
|- style="background: 
| 56 || May 31 || Rockies || – || || || — || Chase Field || || – ||
|-

|- style="background: 
| 57 || June 1 || Rockies || – || || || — || Chase Field || || – ||
|- style="background: 
| 58 || June 2 || Braves || – || || || — || Chase Field || || – ||
|- style="background: 
| 59 || June 3 || Braves || – || || || — || Chase Field || || – ||
|- style="background: 
| 60 || June 4 || Braves || – || || || — || Chase Field || || – ||
|- style="background: 
| 61 || June 6 || @ Nationals || – || || || — || Nationals Park || || – ||
|- style="background: 
| 62 || June 7 || @ Nationals || – || || || — || Nationals Park || || – ||
|- style="background: 
| 63 || June 8 || @ Nationals || – || || || — || Nationals Park || || – ||
|- style="background: 
| 64 || June 9 || @ Tigers || – || || || — || Comerica Park || || – ||
|- style="background: 
| 65 || June 10 || @ Tigers || – || || || — || Comerica Park || || – ||
|- style="background: 
| 66 || June 11 || @ Tigers || – || || || — || Comerica Park || || – ||
|- style="background: 
| 67 || June 12 || Phillies || – || || || — || Chase Field || || – ||
|- style="background: 
| 68 || June 13 || Phillies || – || || || — || Chase Field || || – ||
|- style="background: 
| 69 || June 14 || Phillies || – || || || — || Chase Field || || – ||
|- style="background: 
| 70 || June 15 || Phillies || – || || || — || Chase Field || || – ||
|- style="background: 
| 71 || June 16 || Guardians || – || || || — || Chase Field || || – ||
|- style="background: 
| 72 || June 17 || Guardians || – || || || — || Chase Field || || – ||
|- style="background: 
| 73 || June 18 || Guardians || – || || || — || Chase Field || || – ||
|- style="background: 
| 74 || June 19 || @ Brewers || – || || || — || American Family Field || || – ||
|- style="background: 
| 75 || June 20 || @ Brewers || – || || || — || American Family Field || || – ||
|- style="background: 
| 76 || June 21 || @ Brewers || – || || || — || American Family Field || || – ||
|- style="background: 
| 77 || June 23 || @ Giants || – || || || — || Oracle Park || || – ||
|- style="background: 
| 78 || June 24 || @ Giants || – || || || — || Oracle Park || || – ||
|- style="background: 
| 79 || June 25 || @ Giants || – || || || — || Oracle Park || || – ||
|- style="background: 
| 80 || June 27 || Rays || – || || || — || Chase Field || || – ||
|- style="background: 
| 81 || June 28 || Rays || – || || || — || Chase Field || || – ||
|- style="background: 
| 82 || June 29 || Rays || – || || || — || Chase Field || || – ||
|- style="background: 
| 83 || June 30 || @ Angels || – || || || — || Angel Stadium || || – ||
|-

|- style="background: 
| 84 || July 1 || @ Angels || – || || || — || Angel Stadium || || – ||
|- style="background: 
| 85 || July 2 || @ Angels || – || || || — || Angel Stadium || || – ||
|- style="background: 
| 86 || July 4 || Mets || – || || || — || Chase Field || || – ||
|- style="background: 
| 87 || July 5 || Mets || – || || || — || Chase Field || || – ||
|- style="background: 
| 88 || July 6 || Mets || – || || || — || Chase Field || || – ||
|- style="background: 
| 89 || July 7 || Pirates || – || || || — || Chase Field || || – ||
|- style="background: 
| 90 || July 8 || Pirates || – || || || — || Chase Field || || – ||
|- style="background: 
| 91 || July 9 || Pirates || – || || || — || Chase Field || || – ||
|- style="background:#bbcaff 
| – || July 11 || colspan="10" | 93rd All-Star Game in Seattle, WA
|- style="background: 
| 92 || July 14 || @ Blue Jays || – || || || — || Rogers Centre || || – ||
|- style="background: 
| 93 || July 15 || @ Blue Jays || – || || || — || Rogers Centre || || – ||
|- style="background: 
| 94 || July 16 || @ Blue Jays || – || || || — || Rogers Centre || || – ||
|- style="background: 
| 95 || July 18 || @ Braves || – || || || — || Truist Park || || – ||
|- style="background: 
| 96 || July 19 || @ Braves || – || || || — || Truist Park || || – ||
|- style="background: 
| 97 || July 20 || @ Braves || – || || || — || Truist Park || || – ||
|- style="background: 
| 98 || July 21 || @ Reds || – || || || — || Great American Ball Park || || – ||
|- style="background: 
| 99 || July 22 || @ Reds || – || || || — || Great American Ball Park || || – ||
|- style="background: 
| 100 || July 23 || @ Reds || – || || || — || Great American Ball Park || || – ||
|- style="background: 
| 101 || July 24 || Cardinals || – || || || — || Chase Field || || – ||
|- style="background: 
| 102 || July 25 || Cardinals || – || || || — || Chase Field || || – ||
|- style="background: 
| 103 || July 26 || Cardinals || – || || || — || Chase Field || || – ||
|- style="background: 
| 104 || July 28 || Mariners || – || || || — || Chase Field || || – ||
|- style="background: 
| 105 || July 29 || Mariners || – || || || — || Chase Field || || – ||
|- style="background: 
| 106 || July 30 || Mariners || – || || || — || Chase Field || || – ||
|- style="background: 
| 107 || July 31 || @ Giants || – || || || — || Oracle Park || || – ||
|-

|- style="background: 
| 108 || August 1 || @ Giants || – || || || — || Oracle Park || || – ||
|- style="background: 
| 109 || August 2 || @ Giants || – || || || — || Oracle Park || || – ||
|- style="background: 
| 110 || August 3 || @ Giants || – || || || — || Oracle Park || || – ||
|- style="background: 
| 111 || August 4 || @ Twins || – || || || — || Target Field || || – ||
|- style="background: 
| 112 || August 5 || @ Twins || – || || || — || Target Field || || – ||
|- style="background: 
| 113 || August 6 || @ Twins || – || || || — || Target Field || || – ||
|- style="background: 
| 114 || August 8 || Dodgers || – || || || — || Chase Field || || – ||
|- style="background: 
| 115 || August 9 || Dodgers || – || || || — || Chase Field || || – ||
|- style="background: 
| 116 || August 11 || Padres || – || || || — || Chase Field || || – ||
|- style="background: 
| 117 || August 12 || Padres || – || || || — || Chase Field || || – ||
|- style="background: 
| 118 || August 13 || Padres || – || || || — || Chase Field || || – ||
|- style="background: 
| 119 || August 14 || @ Rockies || – || || || — || Coors Field || || – ||
|- style="background: 
| 120 || August 15 || @ Rockies || – || || || — || Coors Field || || – ||
|- style="background: 
| 121 || August 16 || @ Rockies || – || || || — || Coors Field || || – ||
|- style="background: 
| 122 || August 17 || @ Padres || – || || || — || Petco Park || || – ||
|- style="background: 
| 123 || August 18 || @ Padres || – || || || — || Petco Park || || – ||
|- style="background: 
| 124 || August 19 || @ Padres || – || || || — || Petco Park || || – ||
|- style="background: 
| 125 || August 20 || @ Padres || – || || || — || Petco Park || || – ||
|- style="background: 
| 126 || August 21 || Rangers || – || || || — || Chase Field || || – ||
|- style="background: 
| 127 || August 22 || Rangers || – || || || — || Chase Field || || – ||
|- style="background: 
| 128 || August 24 || Reds || – || || || — || Chase Field || || – ||
|- style="background: 
| 129 || August 25 || Reds || – || || || — || Chase Field || || – ||
|- style="background: 
| 130 || August 26 || Reds || – || || || — || Chase Field || || – ||
|- style="background: 
| 131 || August 27 || Reds || – || || || — || Chase Field || || – ||
|- style="background: 
| 132 || August 28 || @ Dodgers || – || || || — || Dodger Stadium || || – ||
|- style="background: 
| 133 || August 29 || @ Dodgers || – || || || — || Dodger Stadium || || – ||
|- style="background: 
| 134 || August 30 || @ Dodgers || – || || || — || Dodger Stadium || || – ||
|-

|- style="background: 
| 135 || September 1 || Orioles || – || || || — || Chase Field || || – ||
|- style="background: 
| 136 || September 2 || Orioles || – || || || — || Chase Field || || – ||
|- style="background: 
| 137 || September 3 || Orioles || – || || || — || Chase Field || || – ||
|- style="background: 
| 138 || September 4 || Rockies || – || || || — || Chase Field || || – ||
|- style="background: 
| 139 || September 5 || Rockies || – || || || — || Chase Field || || – ||
|- style="background: 
| 140 || September 6 || Rockies || – || || || — || Chase Field || || – ||
|- style="background: 
| 141 || September 7 || @ Cubs || – || || || — || Wrigley Field || || – ||
|- style="background: 
| 142 || September 8 || @ Cubs || – || || || — || Wrigley Field || || – ||
|- style="background: 
| 143 || September 9 || @ Cubs || – || || || — || Wrigley Field || || – ||
|- style="background: 
| 144 || September 10 || @ Cubs || – || || || — || Wrigley Field || || – ||
|- style="background: 
| 145 || September 11 || @ Mets || – || || || — || Citi Field || || – ||
|- style="background: 
| 146 || September 12 || @ Mets || – || || || — || Citi Field || || – ||
|- style="background: 
| 147 || September 13 || @ Mets || – || || || — || Citi Field || || – ||
|- style="background: 
| 148 || September 14 || @ Mets || – || || || — || Citi Field || || – ||
|- style="background: 
| 149 || September 15 || Cubs || – || || || — || Chase Field || || – ||
|- style="background: 
| 150 || September 16 || Cubs || – || || || — || Chase Field || || – ||
|- style="background: 
| 151 || September 17 || Cubs || – || || || — || Chase Field || || – ||
|- style="background: 
| 152 || September 19 || Giants || – || || || — || Chase Field || || – ||
|- style="background: 
| 153 || September 20 || Giants || – || || || — || Chase Field || || – ||
|- style="background: 
| 154 || September 22 || @ Yankees || – || || || — || Yankee Stadium || || – ||
|- style="background: 
| 155 || September 23 || @ Yankees || – || || || — || Yankee Stadium || || – ||
|- style="background: 
| 156 || September 24 || @ Yankees || – || || || — || Yankee Stadium || || – ||
|- style="background: 
| 157 || September 25 || @ White Sox || – || || || — || Guaranteed Rate Field || || – ||
|- style="background: 
| 158 || September 26 || @ White Sox || – || || || — || Guaranteed Rate Field || || – ||
|- style="background: 
| 159 || September 27 || @ White Sox || – || || || — || Guaranteed Rate Field || || – ||
|- style="background: 
| 160 || September 29 || Astros || – || || || — || Chase Field || || – ||
|- style="background: 
| 161 || September 30 || Astros || – || || || — || Chase Field || || – ||
|- style="background: 
| 162 || October 1 || Astros || – || || || — || Chase Field || || – ||
|-

Season standings

National League West

National League Wild Card

Roster

Minor league affiliations

References

External links
Arizona Diamondbacks 2023 schedule at MLB.com
2023 Arizona Diamondbacks season at Baseball Reference

Arizona Diamondbacks
Arizona Diamondbacks
Arizona Diamondbacks seasons